In mathematics, the Gudermannian function relates a hyperbolic angle measure  to a circular angle measure  called the gudermannian of  and denoted . The Gudermannian function reveals a close relationship between the circular functions and hyperbolic functions. It was introduced in the 1760s by Johann Heinrich Lambert, and later named for Christoph Gudermann who also described the relationship between circular and hyperbolic functions in 1830. The gudermannian is sometimes called the hyperbolic amplitude as a limiting case of the Jacobi elliptic amplitude  when parameter 

It is the vertical coordinate of the Mercator projection.



Circular–hyperbolic identities 

We can evaluate the integral of the hyperbolic secant using the stereographic projection (hyperbolic half-tangent) as a change of variables:

Complex values 

As a functions of a complex variable,  conformally maps the infinite strip  to the infinite strip  while  conformally maps the infinite strip  to the infinite strip 

Analytically continued by reflections to the whole complex plane,  is a periodic function of period  which sends any infinite strip of "height"  onto the strip  Likewise, extended to the whole complex plane,  is a periodic function of period  which sends any infinite strip of "width"  onto the strip  For all points in the complex plane, these functions can be correctly written as:

If  then the real and imaginary components  and  can be found by:

(In practical implementation, make sure to use the 2-argument arctangent, 

Likewise, if  then components  and  can be found by:

Multiplying these together reveals the additional identity

Symmetries 

The functions are both odd and they commute with complex conjugation. That is, a reflection across the real or imaginary axis in the domain results in the same reflection in the codomain:

The functions are periodic, with periods  and :

This is related to the identity

Specific values 

A few specific values (where  indicates the limit at one end of the infinite strip):

Derivatives

Argument-addition identities 

By combining hyperbolic and circular argument-addition identities,

with the circular–hyperbolic identity,

we have the Gudermannian argument-addition identities:

Further argument-addition identities can be written in terms of other circular functions, but they require greater care in choosing branches in inverse functions. Notably,

which can be used to derive the per-component computation for the complex Gudermannian and inverse Gudermannian.

In the specific case  double-argument identities are

Taylor series 

where the numbers  are the Euler secant numbers, 1, 0, -1, 0, 5, 0, -61, 0, 1385 ... These series were first computed by James Gregory in 1671.

The reduced unsigned numerators are 1, 1, 1, 61, 277, ... and the reduced denominators are 1, 6, 24, 5040, 72576, ...

History

The function and its inverse are related to the Mercator projection. The vertical coordinate in the Mercator projection is called isometric latitude, and is often denoted  In terms of latitude  on the sphere (expressed in radians) the isometric latitude can be written

Gerardus Mercator plotted his celebrated map in 1569, but the precise method of construction was not revealed. In 1599, Edward Wright described a method for constructing a Mercator projection numerically from trigonometric tables, but did not produce a closed formula. The closed formula was published in 1668 by James Gregory.

The Gudermannian function per se was introduced by Johann Heinrich Lambert in the 1760s at the same time as the hyperbolic functions. He called it the "transcendent angle", and it went by various names until 1862 when Arthur Cayley suggested it be given its current name as a tribute to Christoph Gudermann's work in the 1830s on the theory of special functions.
Gudermann had published articles in Crelle's Journal that were later collected in a book

The notation  was introduced by Cayley who starts by calling  the Jacobi elliptic amplitude  in the degenerate case where the elliptic modulus is  so that  reduces to  This is the inverse of the integral of the secant function. Using Cayley's notation,

He then derives "the definition of the transcendent",

observing that "although exhibited in an imaginary form, [it] is a real function of 

The Gudermannian and its inverse were used to make trigonometric tables of circular functions also function as tables of hyperbolic functions.

Generalization 

The Gudermannian function can be thought of mapping points on one branch of a hyperbola to points on a semicircle. Points on one sheet of an n-dimensional hyperboloid of two sheets can be likewise mapped onto a n-dimensional hemisphere via stereographic projection. The hemisphere model of hyperbolic space uses such a map to represent hyperbolic space.

Applications

The angle of parallelism function in hyperbolic geometry is the complement of the gudermannian, 
 On a Mercator projection a line of constant latitude is parallel to the equator (on the projection) and is displaced by an amount proportional to the inverse Gudermannian of the latitude.
 The Gudermannian (with a complex argument) may be used to define the transverse Mercator projection.

 The Gudermannian appears in a non-periodic solution of the inverted pendulum.
 The Gudermannian appears in a moving mirror solution of the dynamical Casimir effect.
 If an infinite number of infinitely long, equidistant, parallel, coplanar, straight wires are kept at equal potentials with alternating signs, the potential-flux distribution in a cross-sectional plane perpendicular to the wires is the complex Gudermannian.
 The Gudermannian function is a sigmoid function, and as such is sometimes used as an activation function in machine learning.
 The (scaled and shifted) Gudermannian is the cumulative distribution function of the hyperbolic secant distribution.
 A function based on the Gudermannian provides a good model for the shape of spiral galaxy arms.

See also 
Tractrix
Catenary#Catenary of equal strength

Notes

External links 

 Penn, Michael (2020) "the Gudermannian function!" on YouTube.

References 

 
 
 
 
 
 
 
 
 
 
 
 
 
 
 
 
 
  [First published as ]
 
 
 
 
 
 
 
 
 
 

Trigonometry
Elementary special functions
Exponentials